Joachim Westphal may refer to:

Joachim Westphal (of Hamburg) (ca. 1510–1574), German theologian
Joachim Westphal (of Eisleben) (d. 1569), German theologian